Rune Berger (formerly known as Rune Johansen; born 1 April 1978) is a Norwegian footballer who has played for Tromsø, Aalesund and Alta. While at Tromsø he spent a period on loan with Bristol Rovers in England in late 2000. This was his best season as he scored 8 goals in 14 Norwegian Premier League appearances.

After retiring as a player, he became a coach with Alta IF. He advanced from assistant coach to head coach ahead of the 2011 season.

References

External links
100% Fotball, Norwegian football stats

1978 births
Living people
Norwegian footballers
Tromsø IL players
Bristol Rovers F.C. players
Aalesunds FK players
Alta IF players
People from Alta, Norway
Expatriate footballers in England
Norwegian expatriate footballers
Norwegian football managers
Association football forwards
Sportspeople from Troms og Finnmark